In Australian rules football, a ruckman or ruckwoman is typically a tall and athletic player who contests at centre bounces and stoppages (such as boundary throw-ins and ball-ups).   The ruckman is one of the most important players on the field.  They are often key to coaching strategy and winning centre clearances which result in the most goal kicking opportunities (inside 50s).

The role of the ruckman in Australian rules is similar to a lock in rugby union contesting a line-out.  The key differences are that with the exception of boundary throw-ins, the ball is almost always thrown straight up high into the air rather than horizontally, so in this respect, the ruckman is similar to a basketball centre.  The ruckman needs to be able to control the ball by palm tap or fist with outstretched arms.  Unlike rugby, the ruckman must rely on vertical leap and can not be assisted by teammates to jump. Australian football rucking often involves vigorous mid-air collisions with the opposing ruckman.

With no offside or knock on rules, the ruckman can tap the ball in any direction.  Before a bounce down or ball up, ruckmen confer with the onballers (rovers and ruck-rovers) to pre-determine the direction of the tap so that they can position themselves to best receive it to the team's advantage.

The ruckman is typically the tallest player on either team.  A typical professional Australian Football League ruckman is over 200 cm or 6'7.

When a ruckman beats his opponent by contacting the ball, it is called a hit out and measured as a statistic and performance indicator of effective ruckwork.   Although the ruckman is the primary player to score hit-outs, sometimes tall key position players fill in for the ruckman around the ground if the ruckman cannot run to make the contest in time.

Rucking is one of the most physically demanding positions on the ground, both in terms of fitness and body contact.  As a result of the high level of physical contact of clashing with opponents in the air, many ruckmen have large physiques or bulk up to prevent injury.  As well, due to the use of knees when jumping, many ruckmen wear protective thigh and shin padding, whereas players in other positions rarely do.  Coaches often field more than one ruckman and rotate them due to the physical pressure of the position and the endurance of having to run to ruck contests around the ground.

Ruck styles

Ruckmen are sometimes classified by their style of play, although many players alternate styles during a game based on strategy, the style of an opponent, their physical attributes and versatility.

A tap ruckman (or palm ruckman) is the most skillful and high jumping of styles.  Players using this style will deftly palm the ball directly down to the advantage of a smaller teammate or rover, often making their hitouts the most effective.  WAFL and VFL great Polly Farmer is considered to be one of the best all-time ruckmen of this style. The AFL's Aaron Sandilands is a good recent example.

A mobile ruckman (or mobile bigman) often describes a ruckman that covers a lot of ground.  Sometime this type of ruckman is not as tall, as big, or effective at hit outs, but may possess a high leap and greater athletic endurance.  Against less mobile ruckmen, this type of player can compensate with an ability to take more marks around the ground playing effectively as a tall ruck rover and sometimes with the additional ability to kick goals while playing from the midfield or drop back into defence when required. The 1980s and 1990s were the dominant era for the modern mobile ruckmen in the VFL/AFL and Jim Stynes was one of the first in this mould.

A heavy ruckman (or thump ruckman) practices a more physical style of rucking. Typically, the player is of a larger or taller build and uses brute force (and a style often referred to as "crash and bash") to take their opponent out of the contest and punch the ball forward, typically going for distance and penetration into their attacking zone.  These players are typically slower around the ground and less inclined to jump, as such are sometimes referred to as "dinosaurs" and sometimes criticised for a lack of skill around the ground. Heavy ruckmen became the dominant rucks in the VFL/AFL in the 1890s and also the 1960s and 1970s. This type of ruckwork is rarer in the modern game, more so at its highest level.  At the beginning of 2003, the AFL rules were changed so that ruckmen must stand at opposite sides and run towards each other. This change affected thump ruckmen especially as players must now maximise their jump and reach if they are to win the tap.

Strategies using ruckmen
Ruckmen are often used by coaches strategically.

Attacking strategies

Using tandem ruckmen, often known as third man up, is a tactic often employed around the ground as a set play strategy (though was made illegal in the AFL from 2016).  As only one ruckman from each side can be used at centre bounces, this tactic is restricted to boundary throw-ins and bounces.  It involves a second tall or high jumping player from one of the sides contesting the ruck, typically when the taller ruckmen are wrestling at ground level or consistently ineffective in getting a clear tap away.  The tactic became especially popular during the 2015 season.  It often results in a thump forward to keep the ball moving towards goal, as it is difficult for the shorter player contesting the ruck to aim a tap.  This is because they are not able to be assisted by lifting and can often be put off balance in the air when jumping over the top of ruckmen.  Additionally, by committing an extra player to the ruck contest, there is one less player from that team around the contest - though this can also have the effect of opening up space for more creative roving players.  Some key position players are designated secondary ruckmen for boundary throw-ins and will sometimes be used in tandem ruckwork.

During kick-ins the ruckman can sometimes be a designated target.  With extra height it is difficult for opposition players to take marks against them and they are an easier target to spot in a cluster. However the AFL's introduction of Gaelic Football's quick kick-in rule in 2006 tended to favour shorter passes to smaller players over set plays with high kicks involving the ruckman.

In a contested situation, the ruckman may be instructed to "bring the ball to ground", so that the smaller rovers or crumbers on their team know to attack the ball from front and square positions to gain possession.

Ruckmen are sometimes dropped into the goal square during an attack on goals from outside scoring distance.  This way they become a tall marking target if a player decides to "bomb" a kick into the goal square.  The term resting ruckman is used when a ruckman is played in the forward line between stints in the ruck.  As the ruck requires almost constant running, "resting" in the forward line gives the ruckman much needed breaks and with their heights they do not need to run or lead as much into space to contest marks when the ball does reach the forward line.

Defensive strategies
Some coaches instruct ruckmen to drop back into the hole, which effectively is the open space in which a full-forward might lead.  This way the tall player can cut off a low pass designed to hit a full-forward.  Standing in the road of a large forward leading out at full speed requires a lot of courage.

Ruckmen will sometimes be designated to stand the mark when an opposition takes a kick on goal.  The extra height of the ruckman means that the player has to kick higher, meaning more chance of missing, dropping short or even the possibility of actually kicking into the man on the mark (called a smother).

When an opposition player is having a set shot at goal, particularly from a long distance or on an acute angle, the ruckman may be instructed to run all the way to the goal square to protect it, temporarily playing a similar role to a goalkeeper in soccer or gaelic football.  Despite no height limit for the goal, the ball will always have a curved trajectory and many kicks tend to drop short.  Being the tallest player, it gives the ruckman the best opportunity of any player to touch the ball before it goes through the goal posts and create an obstacle in area of goal to kick through.  This can result in a behind instead of a goal and save 5 points, or can remain in the field of play with no score.

Ruck history and rules
The ball-up has been a feature of the Laws of the Game since 1872, necessitating a "ruck" with the term entering the Australian rules vernacular around 1876. The term for the player was not initially gendered, "ruck-man" or "ruckman" did not enter general use until early in the 20th Century (circa 1903). Bouncing the ball for the ruck became common from as early as 1880; the rules formally changed to a mandate a bounce in 1887.

In 2004, a new centre circle rule was introduced to reduce the ruckman's run-up.  The aim was to decrease the knee clashes and posterior cruciate ligament injuries experienced by many ruckmen.  The new rules favour taller players and those with high vertical leaps, and many mobile ruckmen now find it difficult to contest.

During the 2008 AFL season, the AFL introduced an additional two boundary umpires which many labelled the "quick throw-in" rule.  Designed to make the game faster and more attractive for television viewers, this new rule had the unintended effect of many professional ruckmen no longer being able to contest boundary throw-ins.

The practice of "third man up" was outlawed for the 2017 season and beyond, in order to protect ruckmen. A player from each team must be "nominated" at each ruck contest, and only the nominated players can contest the ruck. No other player may come into contact with the ball until it has been hit by either ruckman or until the ball hits the ground, or they will have a "ruck infringement" free kick given against them.  Due to initial practice phase during the JLT Community Series, many free kicks were given against players who accidentally came into contact with the ball, especially when they were not watching the contest. A notable example of this was when Adelaide Crows player Dean Gore was penalised after the ball hit him before it had been cleared. Gore was facing away from the contest. As a direct result of this and other similar incidents, the AFL clarified the rule, so that if the field umpire concluded that a player genuinely contacted the ball accidentally, a play on would be called.

Modern ruckmen

Examples of modern-day ruckmen in the Australian Football League include Max Gawn, Brodie Grundy, Nic Naitanui and Todd Goldstein.

Aaron Sandilands stood at 2.11m (6 ft 11 in) which was the equal tallest (along with Peter Street, Mason Cox and Ned Reeves) ruckman in AFL/VFL history and was considered to be one of the most dominant ruckmen in the game.

Recruiting
Due to the requirement for ruckmen to be very tall, in recent years clubs have often gone outside of the traditional junior football leagues to recruit ruckmen. He had previously won an NBL championship with the Adelaide 36ers. Other basketballers such as David Fanning (Cairns Taipans and ), Daniel Bass (Metropolitan State University of Denver and ), Seamus McNamara (Marist College, TSV Dachau Spurs and ),  Alex Starling (Bethune-Cookman University and ) and Ben Dowell (Santa Clara University and ) have all been recruited, but have not been as successful as Brogan in converting to Australian football at the AFL level. Another non-traditional recruit, Mike Pyke (Canada rugby union, US Montauban and Sydney), has enjoyed somewhat more AFL success than most of the aforementioned basketballers. Jason Holmes was also recruited from a college basketball background and became the first Americans to play in the AFL. The aforementioned Mason Cox (Oklahoma State University basketball and ) has also had a solid career to date.

See also
 Follower (Australian rules football)

References

External links

Video of Matthew Primus demonstrating basics of ruckwork

Australian rules football terminology